Capetoxotus is a genus of beetles in the family Cerambycidae, and the only species in the genus is Capetoxotus rugosus. It was described by Tippmann in 1959.

References

Dorcasominae
Beetles described in 1959
Monotypic Cerambycidae genera